Gujaran Na Mohra is a union council in the Islamabad Capital Territory of Pakistan. It is located at 33° 26' 50N 73° 25' 0E with an altitude of 572 metres (1879 feet).

References 

Union councils of Islamabad Capital Territory